Thomas Collins (1732 – March 29, 1789) was an American planter and politician from Smyrna, in Kent County, Delaware. He was an officer of the Delaware militia during the American Revolution, and served in the Delaware General Assembly and as President of Delaware.

Early life and family
Collins was born in Duck Creek, now Smyrna, Delaware, married Sarah, and had four children, William, Elizabeth, Mary, and Sarah. His sister was the wife of former Governor John Cook. Collins was trained in the law, but never practiced, and must have had considerable wealth available to him as he purchased several large tracts of land in the Duck Creek area early in life. They lived first at Gloster on the south side of Dawson's Branch and after 1771 at Belmont Hall, now on U.S. Highway 13, south of Smyrna. They were members of St. Peter's Episcopal Church.

Military career
Collins began his military career during the American Revolution as lieutenant colonel in Caesar Rodney's Upper Kent militia and within a year was a brigadier general of the Delaware Militia. Collins served with General George Washington in New Jersey in 1777, but returned home to contend with loyalist uprisings in Sussex County. He was probably involved in the efforts to block General William Howe on his march from the Elk River, but there is no evidence that he was at the actual Battle of Brandywine.

Professional and political career

Collins served as Sheriff of Kent County from 1764 until 1767, and was a member of the Colonial Assembly in five of the nine annual sessions during the period from the 1767/68 session through the 1775/76 session. He was a member of the Delaware Constitutional Convention of 1776 and was elected to two terms in the Legislative Council beginning with the 1776/77 session and continuing through the 1782/83 session, serving as the Speaker in the 1778/79 session and in the 1781/82 session. In 1782 he became a Judge of the Court of Common Pleas. The Delaware General Assembly unanimously elected him State President in 1786 and he served from October 28, 1786 until his death on March 29, 1789. It was during his term of office that Delaware became the first state to ratify the U.S. Constitution on December 7, 1787.

Death and legacy
Collins died at Duck Creek, now Smyrna. He was buried in the Collins Family Cemetery, but his remains were later moved into the St. Peter's Episcopal Church Cemetery at Smyrna.  He was the first State President to die in office.

The Thomas Collins state office building on U.S. Highway 13 in Dover is named in his honor.

Almanac
Elections were held October 1 and members of the General Assembly took office on October 20 or the following weekday. State Legislative Councilmen had a three-year term and State Assemblymen had a one-year term. The whole General Assembly chose the State President for a three-year term. The county sheriff also had a three-year term. Judges of the Courts of Common Pleas were also selected by the General Assembly for the life of the person appointed.

References

External links
 Hall of Governors Portrait Gallery, Portrait courtesy of Historical and Cultural Affairs, Dover.
 Delaware’s Governors
 Delaware Historical Society; website
 University of Delaware; Library website

1732 births
1789 deaths
People from Smyrna, Delaware
People of colonial Delaware
18th-century American Episcopalians
Delaware Independents
Governors of Delaware
Independent state governors of the United States
Members of the Delaware House of Representatives
Delaware state senators
Delaware Court of Common Pleas judges
American planters
Delaware militiamen in the American Revolution
Burials in Kent County, Delaware
18th-century American politicians